Retinia coeruleostriana is a species of moth of the family Tortricidae. It is found in China (Beijing, Hebei, Shanxi, Fujian, Henan, Sichuan, Yunnan, Shaanxi, Gansu), Japan and Russia.

The wingspan is about 15 mm.

The larvae feed on Pinus densiflora.

References

Moths described in 1939
Eucosmini